The 2020 TCR Eastern Europe Trophy (also called 2020 TCR Eastern Europe Trophy powered by ESET for sponsorship reasons) was the second season of the TCR Eastern Europe Trophy. The season began on 24 July at the Automotodrom Grobnik and ended on 18 October at the Hungaroring.

Dušan Borković won the championship with 3 races to go.

Calendar 
A new calendar was announced on 25 April 2020 with all rounds supporting the ESET V4 Cup.

Teams and drivers

Results

Drivers' standings 
Scoring system

† – Drivers did not finish the race, but were classified as they completed over 70% of the race distance.

Teams' standings 

† – Drivers did not finish the race, but were classified as they completed over 70% of the race distance.

Juniors' standings 

† – Drivers did not finish the race, but were classified as they completed over 70% of the race distance.

Notes

References

External links 

 

TCR Eastern Europe Trophy
Eastern Europe Trophy